William Maitland may refer to:

 William Maitland of Lethington (1525–1573), Scottish politician and reformer
 William Maitland (historian) (1693–1757), Scottish merchant, historian and topographer
 William Fuller Maitland (1813–1876), English picture collector
 William Whitaker Maitland (1794–1861), British landowner and High Sheriff of Essex